Thomas Dunne (19 March 1927 – 23 January 1988) is an Irish former footballer who played as a wing-half.

Dunne was born in Dublin. He is a nephew of the famed Jimmy Dunne. He began his senior career with Shamrock Rovers in 1949.

During his time at Milltown he won the FAI Cup despite being sent off in a first round tie.

In November 1949 Tommy transferred to Leicester City.

Honours
Shamrock Rovers
 FAI Cup: 1948
 Inter-City Cup: 1949
 LFA President's Cup: 1948–49

Sources 
 The Hoops by Paul Doolan and Robert Goggins

References

1927 births
1988 deaths
Republic of Ireland association footballers
Association football midfielders
English Football League players
League of Ireland players
Shamrock Rovers F.C. players
Leicester City F.C. players
Exeter City F.C. players
Shrewsbury Town F.C. players
Southport F.C. players